The National Gay and Lesbian Sports Hall of Fame was a hall of fame established in 2013 to honor LGBT and allied personalities, as well as organizations "whose achievements and efforts have enhanced sports and athletics for the gay and lesbian community". It was established shortly after Jason Collins became the first openly gay NBA player. It is located on the grounds of Center on Halsted in Chicago, Illinois.

Inductees
The 2013 induction class was announced on June 18, 2013, with a formal induction ceremony scheduled for August 2. Inductees were brought in, in 2013, 2014, and 2015.

 Kye Allums, 2015
 John Amaechi, 2014
 Anheuser-Busch, 2013
 Brendon Ayanbadejo, 2013
 Billy Bean, 2014
 Mark Bingham, 2014
 Roger Brigham, 2015
 Glenn Burke, 2013
 Ben Cohen, 2013
 Jason Collins, 2013
 Orlando Cruz, 2013
 Chicago Cubs, 2013
 Tom Daley, 2014
 Wade Davis, 2014
 Gene Dermody, 2015
 Chuck Dima, 2013
 Justin Fashanu, 2013
 Federation of Gay Games, 2013
 Fallon Fox, 2014
 Andrew Goldstein, 2013
 LZ Granderson, 2013
 Brittney Griner, 2014
 International Gay Rodeo Association, 2013
 Helen Hull Jacobs, 2015
 Christina Kahrl, 2013
 Billie Jean King, 2013
 Chris Kluwe, 2013
 Dave Kopay, 2013
 Greg Louganis, 2013
 Chris Morgan, 2015
 George Moscone, 2014
 Chris Mosier, 2014
 Martina Navratilova, 2013
 Nike, 2014
 Diana Nyad, 2014
 Outsports.com, 2013
 Dave Pallone, 2013
 Jerry Pritikin, 2013
 Megan Rapinoe, 2015
 Renée Richards, 2013
 Robbie Rogers, 2015
 Dale Scott, 2015
 Patty Sheehan, 2013
 Roy Simmons, 2015
 Jerry Smith, 2014
 Stand Up Foundation, 2014
 Gareth Thomas, 2014
 Esera Tuaolo, 2014
 Dr. Tom Waddell, 2013
 Johnny Weir, 2013

See also
 Homosexuality in sports
 List of LGBT sportspeople
 Principle 6 campaign

References

2013 establishments in Illinois
All-sports halls of fame
Halls of fame in Illinois
LGBT culture in Chicago
LGBT halls of fame
LGBT museums and archives
LGBT sports organizations in the United States
Museums established in 2013
Museums in Chicago
Sports museums in Illinois
Sexual orientation and sports